Hiroko Kuwata was the defending champion, but lost in the first round to Shiho Akita.

Magdaléna Rybáriková won the title, defeating Zhu Lin in the final, 6–2, 6–3.

Seeds

Draw

Finals

Top half

Bottom half

References
Main Draw

Kangaroo Cup - Singles
Kangaroo Cup
2017 in Japanese tennis